10 Milner Street, also known as Stanley House is a Grade II listed house in Milner Street, Chelsea, London, England.

It is a double-fronted house in an Italianate style, and was built by the Chelsea speculator John Todd in 1855, for his own occupation.

It was later home to Sir Courtenay Ilbert.

From 1945, his nephew, the interior designer Michael Inchbald lived there, and continued to do so after Ibert's death.

In 1960, the Inchbald School of Design was founded in the basement by his wife Jacqueline Ann Duncan (then Jacqueline Inchbald).  The Inchbald School was founded in the old ground floor drawing room, which once housed the Ilbert Collection of clocks, watches, marine chronometers and sundials.

It has been Grade II listed since 1969.

References

Chelsea, London
Houses completed in 1855
Grade II listed houses in the Royal Borough of Kensington and Chelsea
Italianate architecture in England